Divine Mother or Mother Divine may refer to:

Adi Parashakti, a goddess in the Hindu religion
Bhagavathi, female goddesses in Hinduism, especially in Kerala
Blessed Virgin Mary (Roman Catholic), of Roman Catholicism religion
Wives of American religious leader Father Divine
Edna Rose Ritchings (c. 1925–2017)
Peninniah 
Hindu mother goddess
Lady Master Venus, a goddess in Ascended Master Teachings
Maharishi Vedic Education Development Corporation, which claims this term as a trademark of own
Mirra Alfassa (1878–1973), known as "The Mother" in Hindu or Neo-Hindu context
Mother goddess, a term used to refer to certain genre of goddess
Shekhinah, feminine attributes of the presence of God

See also
God the Mother (disambiguation)
Goddess worship (disambiguation)
Magna Mater (disambiguation)